Anne Borg may refer to:

 Anne Borg (dancer) (1936–2016), Norwegian ballet dancer
 Anne Borg (physicist) (born 1958), Norwegian physicist